Gottfried Arnold (February 10, 1933 – December 28, 2015) was a German politician of the Christian Democratic Union (CDU) and former member of the German Bundestag.

Life 
Arnold was a member of the CDU and from 1970 to 1981 chairman of the Düsseldorf CDU district association. Gottfried Arnold was a member of the German Bundestag from 1961 to 1983. In parliament he represented the constituency of Düsseldorf.

Literature

References

1933 births
2015 deaths
Members of the Bundestag for North Rhine-Westphalia
Members of the Bundestag 1980–1983
Members of the Bundestag 1976–1980
Members of the Bundestag 1972–1976
Members of the Bundestag 1969–1972
Members of the Bundestag 1965–1969
Members of the Bundestag 1961–1965
Members of the Bundestag for the Christian Democratic Union of Germany
Rheinische Post people